

ti
Ti-Screen

tia

tiab-tiap
tiabendazole (INN)
tiacrilast (INN)
tiadenol (INN)
tiafibrate (INN)
tiagabine (INN)
Tiamate
tiamenidine (INN)
tiametonium iodide (INN)
tiamiprine (INN)
tiamizide (INN)
Tiamol
tiamulin (INN)
tianafac (INN)
tianeptine (INN)
tiapamil (INN)
tiapirinol (INN)
tiapride (INN)
tiaprofenic acid (INN)
tiaprost (INN)

tiar-tiaz
tiaramide (INN)
Tiazac
tiazesim (INN)
tiazofurine (INN)
tiazuril (INN)

tib-tie
tibalosin (INN)
tibeglisene (INN)
tibenelast (INN)
tibenzate (INN)
tibezonium iodide (INN)
tibolone (INN)
tibric acid (INN)
tibrofan (INN)
ticabesone (INN)
ticagrelor (USAN)
Ticar
ticarbodine (INN)
ticarcillin (INN)
ticarcillin/clavulanic acid 
TICE BCG (Organon Teknika Corp)
ticlatone (INN)
Ticlid
ticlopidine (INN)
ticolubant (INN)
tideglusib (INN)
tidembersat (INN)
tidiacic (INN)
tiemonium iodide (INN)
tienilic acid (INN)
tienocarbine (INN)
tienopramine (INN)
tienoxolol (INN)

tif-tik
tifacogin (INN)
tifemoxone (INN)
tifenamil (INN)
tifencillin (INN)
tiflamizole (INN)
tiflorex (INN)
tifluadom (INN)
tiflucarbine (INN)
tiformin (INN)
tifurac (INN)
tifuvirtide (INN)
Tigan
tigapotide (USAN)
tigatuzumab (USAN)
tigecycline (USAN)
tigemonam (INN)
tigestol (INN)
tigloidine (INN)
Tiject-20
Tikosyn

til
tilactase (INN)
Tilade
tilarginine acetate (USAN)
tilbroquinol (INN)
tildipirosine (INN)
tiletamine (INN)
tilidine (INN)
tiliquinatine (USAN)
tiliquinol (INN)
tilisolol (INN)
tilivapram (USAN)
tilmacoxib (USAN)
tilmicosin (INN)
tilnoprofen arbamel (INN)
tilomisole (INN)
tilorone (INN)
tilozepine (INN)
tilsuprost (INN)
tiludronate (INN)
tiludronic acid (INN)

tim-tin
Tim-AK
Timecelles
timefurone (INN)
timegadine (INN)
timelotem (INN)
Timentin
timepidium bromide (INN)
timiperone (INN)
timirdine (INN)
timobesone (INN)
timofibrate (INN)
Timolide
timolol (INN)
timonacic (INN)
timoprazole (INN)
Timoptic
tinabinol (INN)
Tinactin Antifungal
Tinaderm
Tinamed
tinazoline (INN)
TinBen
Tindal
Tindamax
Ting
tinidazole (INN)
tinisulpride (INN)
tinofedrine (INN)
tinoridine (INN)
Tinver
tinzaparin sodium (INN)

tio
tiocarlide (INN)
tioclomarol (INN)
tioconazole (INN)
tioctilate (INN)
tiodazosin (INN)
tiodonium chloride (INN)
tioguanine (INN)
tiomergine (INN)
tiomesterone (INN)
tiomolibdate diammonium (USAN)
tiomolibdic acid (USAN)
tioperidone (INN)
tiopinac (INN)
tiopronin (INN)
tiopropamine (INN)
tiosalan (INN)
tiospirone (INN)
tiotidine (INN)
tiotixene (INN)
tiotropium bromide (INN)
tioxacin (INN)
tioxamast (INN)
tioxaprofen (INN)
tioxidazole (INN)
tioxolone (INN)

tip-tis
tipapkinogene sovacivec (INN)
tipelukast (USAN)
tipentosin (INN)
tipepidine (INN)
tipetropium bromide (INN)
tipifarnib (USAN)
tipindole (INN)
tiplasinin (USAN)
tiplimotide (INN)
tipredane (INN)
tiprelestat (INN)
tiprenolol (INN)
tiprinast (INN)
tiprolisant (USAN)
tipropidil (INN)
tiprostanide (INN)
tiprotimod (INN)
TipTapToe
tiqueside (INN)
tiquinamide (INN)
tiquizium bromide (INN)
tiracizine (INN)
tirapazamine (INN)
tiratricol (INN)
tirilazad (INN)
tirofiban (INN)
tiropramide (INN)
Tis-U-Sol
Tiseb
Tisit
tisocalcitate (USAN)
tisocromide (INN)
tisopurine (INN)
tisoquone (INN)
Titralac

tiv-tiz
tivanidazole (INN)
tivantinib (INN)
tivirapine (INN)
tivozanib (USAN, INN)
tixadil (INN)
tixanox (INN)
tixocortol (INN)
tizabrin (INN)
tizanidine (INN)
tizolemide (INN)
tizoprolic acid (INN)